Jozef Cantré (26 December 1890 – 29 August 1957) was a Belgian sculptor and illustrator. He was one of the main artists in the development of the Flemish Expressionism style.

Biography
Jozef Cantré was born in Ghent in 1890, four years after his brother Jan Frans. His father was a house painter. He studied art at the Royal Academy, together with Frans Masereel; his teachers included Jean Delvin and Felix Metdepenningen. He was politically active in a socialist youth movement and later created the "Rode Jeugd" ("Red Youth").

He studied Literature at the Von Bissing University from 1916 on, together with the poet Richard Minne. Already in March 1918 he was appointed lector in drawing. His role in this university, created by the German occupier, led to his conviction in 1920, when he was sentenced to 5 years imprisonment. This sentence was removed in 1929.

On 27 October 1918, when it became clear that Germany would lose the war, Cantré fled the country. He then lived in Blaricum until 1921 and then in Oisterwijk, both in the Netherlands, where he was joined by Frits Van den Berghe and Gustave de Smet. In 1930 he returned to Belgium where he moved to Sint-Martens-Latem, which would become the center of the Flemish art during the interbellum. By 1931 he lived in the nearby Astene, where Hubert Malfait became his neighbour. Afterwards he moved to Ghent.

Between 1941 and 1946 he was a teacher at the La Cambre Art Institute.

He was married to Martha Vandaele; they had one son, Walter Cantré.

Art
His early art is influenced by Georges Minne and Constantin Meunier. Later influences include fauvism, cubism and German Expressionism, before he became one of the founders of the so-called Flemish expressionism.

He was one of the main avant-garde illustrators in Belgium between World War I and World War II as a member of De Vijf ("The Five") together with his brother Jan Frans Cantré, Joris Minne, Frans Masereel and Henri Van Straeten. Most of his graphic work consisted of engravings and woodcuts, as stand-alone works, ex-libris, or book illustrations. As a sculptor, he worked in wood, clay and bronze.

Together with Frits Van den Berghe and Gustave de Smet he is also considered one of the pioneers of the Flemish Expressionism, and together with Oscar Jespers the main sculptor in the movement.

Bibliography

1918: Maurice Roelants, "De kom der loutering"
1918: illustrations, including the title, for the magazine "De Regenboog"
1928-: illustrations for "Variétés", magazine created by Paul-Gustave Van Hecke
1928: Georges Eekhoud, "Les sorciers de Borght"
1929: Maurits de Doncker, "Gedoofder vuren as"
1930: Marnix van Gavere, "Gedichten"
1933: Willem Elsschot, "Kaas"
1937: 7 illustrations for "De boer die sterft" by Karel Van de Woestijne
1944: Marcel Arland, "Cinq contes", 6 illustrations

Major sculptures

 
1922: double portrait of Frits Van den Berghe en Gustave de Smet
The poet Karel Van de Woestijne
Monument for Edward Anseele in Ghent
1952: Relief in the facade of the Brussels-Congress railway station

Exposition
1921: exposition together with Frits Van den Berghe in "Sélection"
1925 (March–April): Basel, "Ausstellung Belgischer Kunst"
1927 (June): exposition of 7 Flemish artists at La Centaure in Brussels
1927 (August–September): Hamburg, Museum, "Europäische Kunst der Gegenwart", including 10 Belgian artists
1927 (September): Grenoble, Museum, "L'Art Belge Contemporain"
1928 (May–June): Paris, Musée du Jeu de Paume, "L'Art Belge depuis l'Impressionisme"
1932: Antwerp, Museum Plantin-Moretus, solo exhibition of his work between 1908 and 1932
1933 (April–May): exposition together with Frits Van den Berghe in the Vooruit in Ghent
1942: foundation of the Museum van Latem en de Leiestreek, which includes works by Cantré
1957 (December) - 1958 (January): Utrecht, Museum of New Religious Art: solo exposition
1959: Brussels, Royal Library of Belgium: solo exposition of the graphic work of Cantré
1967 (July–August): Brussels, Royal Library of Belgium: woodcuts by "De Vijf"
1975 (September–November): Deinze, retrospective of his work and that of his brother Jan Frans
2017 (September) - 2018 (January): Deinze, museum, retrospective of his work

Notes

Further reading

1890 births
1957 deaths
Expressionist sculptors
20th-century Belgian sculptors
Belgian illustrators